Plagopterinae is a subfamily of the freshwater fish family Leuciscidae, which contains the true minnows. Members of this family are known as creek chubs or the creek chub-plagopterin (CC-P) clade of minnows. All members of this family are found in North America, and it includes among the northernmost-distributed of all North American minnows, the lake chub.

Genera 

 Couesius (lake chub)
 Hemitremia (flame chub)
 Lepidomeda (spinedaces)
 Margariscus (pearl daces)
 Meda (spikedace)
 Plagopterus (woundfin)
 Semotilus (creek chubs)

References 

Plagopterinae
Fish subfamilies
Taxa named by Edward Drinker Cope